Shelby is the name of some places in the U.S. state of Michigan:
Shelby Charter Township, Michigan in Macomb County
Shelby, Macomb County, Michigan, an unincorporated community
Shelby Township, Michigan in Oceana County
Shelby, Oceana County, Michigan, a village